Ullikkadai is a village in the Papanasam taluk of Thanjavur district, Tamil Nadu, India.

Demographics 

As per the 2001 census, Ullikkadai had a total population of 2962 with 1474 males and 1488 females. The sex ratio was 1009. The literacy rate was 72.9.

References 

 

Villages in Thanjavur district